In the Veszprém stabbing of 8 February 2009, a group of Romani people stabbed three members of the MKB Veszprém handball team in a bar in Veszprém, Hungary. One of them, Marian Cozma, was killed.

Circumstances
During the summer of 2008 the mafia clan of the Raffael and Sztojka Romani families based in the town of Enying, Hungary started to take power in the nightlife of the northern shore of Lake Balaton, a major tourist destination of Hungary. Siófok was a favorite place of the clan and frequently caused problem for the owners since they often made quarrels and did not pay their bills.

Not a long time before the case, two of the three suspected persons (including Iván Sztojka) were released from prison after the duration of their prison sentence was mitigated by one third because of "good behavior".
Witnesses from Enying have stated that the town is under the terror of the clan. Residents claim to know the clan's gathering point, a gas station. Locals allege that not long before the murder, the police stopped a truck loaded with supposedly stolen metal but the driver threatened the policeman while sticking a pistol in his mouth. (Metal theft by organized crime gangs is a serious problem in Hungary, having caused traffic delays and power and telephone outages.) However, police denies that the crime rate of Enying is above average. The Patrióta Lokál, the scene of the murder is a bar mostly serving as a club with a stable guest circle (including the handball team). In 2008, the bar won the town's "safe bar prize".

7 February 2009
In the afternoon on Saturday, 7 February 2009, a criminal from Veszprém, who had just left the prison knocked down one of the members of the clan, who suffered severe injuries. The clan-member organized a group of family and friends from the villages of Enying and Dég (different sources cite 15, 20 or 30 people, including suspected Iván Sztojka, Sándor Raffael and Győző Németh) to take a vengeance and started to search for the person in Veszprém at night to "settle" the problem. They thought the person would stay that night at the bar called Patrióta Lokál (English: Patriot local) also known as Skorpió bár (English: Scorpion bar).

8 February 2009
Cozma and other members of the KC Veszprém handball team (including Croat goalkeeper Ivan Pešić and Serb playmaker Žarko Šešum) arrived at the two-storey bar at around 12:30 a.m. to celebrate the birth of teammate Gergő Iváncsik's son and the birthday of teammate Nikola Eklemović. They stayed in the dance hall in the lower storey (basement). The upper storey serves as a cocktail bar. A group of 15 arrived at the bar between 1:30 and 2:00 a.m. They went down into the crowded dance hall and three of them - Raffael, Sztojka and Németh - immediately started to banter others. Many people - shocked by the appearance of the never-seen-before gang - left the place. As CCTV recordings shows, the gang of 3 picked on the sportsmen and attacked them without any reason. Subsequently, the music was shut down and people started to flee the place. The recordings of the camera over the stairway show Cozma running up to the exit pursued by his attackers. In front of the bar, Cozma was stabbed in the back, and he collapsed. Raffael then went up to him and stabbed him twice in the heart. When his teammates wanted to help Cozma, the other two attackers - Sztojka and Németh - stabbed Pešić in the kidney and kicked Šešum in the head. Police denied the rumors about the bartender girl being assaulted.  

The police who arrived at the scene resuscitated Cozma, and the three injured players were taken to a hospital. Cozma died in the hospital two hours later. Pešić had to have his kidney removed, and Šešum suffered severe craniocerebral trauma from the kick to the head.

The murder was caught on tape by nearby surveillance cameras, and records proved that the person who actually killed Cozma was Sándor Raffael. Three men were wanted in connection of the crime, Iván Sztojka, Győző Németh and Sándor Raffael.

Aftermath
Footage showing Győző Németh, the second suspect in the murder case, handcuffed and being detained by the Austrian police became publicly available. The newspaper Magyar Hírlap published an editorial on the case. Ferenc Gyurcsány, the Hungarian prime minister criticized the newspaper, saying that the gravity of the criminal act is to be considered, not the ethnic origin of the suspects. After a nationwide manhunt which included setting up a special investigative unit and offering 2 million Hungarian Forints (approximately €7,000) for information on the suspect's whereabouts, Iván Sztojka gave himself up at the Veszprém Police station on the night of 12 February, at the pressures of the leader of his Romani community. He allegedly denied his participation in the crime, stating that he was only "at the wrong place at a wrong time". Petre Cozma, Marian Cozma's father, consistently said that not all Roma should be considered guilty for his son's death. He stated, "Let's not burn a forest for a sapless stub". János Ladányi, a Hungarian sociologist, was of the opinion that the anti-gypsy attitude reached such an irrational level that even a civil war was possible. Attacks against Romani people in Hungary have been recorded after the incident, however, there is no evidence of racist motive in either case.

In 2011, two of the men who killed Cozma, Sandor Raffael and Gyozo Nemeth, got life sentences, while a third defendant, Ivan Sztojka, was sentenced to 20 years in prison. Raffael claimed to regret his actions, stating to the court: “The greatest sin a man can commit is take the life of another human being.” Later, the sentences were shortened: Sandor Raffael and Gyozo Nemeth received 18-year prison sentences, while Ivan Sztojka was sentenced to 13 years in jail.

References

Deaths by stabbing in Hungary
2009 murders in Hungary
People murdered by organized crime
Romani in Hungary
Romani-related controversies
Filmed killings
Veszprém
Murder in Hungary